The J Award of 2015 is the eleventh annual J Awards, established by the Australian Broadcasting Corporation's youth-focused radio station Triple J. The announcement comes at the culmination of Ausmusic Month (November). For the second year, four awards were presented; Australian Album of the Year, Double J Artist of the Year, Australian Music Video of the Year and Unearthed Artist of the Year.

The eligible period took place between November 2014 and October 2015. The winners were announced live on air on Triple J on Tuesday 19 November 2015.

Awards

Australian Album of the Year

Double J Artist of the Year

Australian Video of the Year

Unearthed Artist of the Year

References

2015 in Australian music
2015 music awards
J Awards